Guatemalan Democratic Vanguard was a left-wing group in Guatemala. The VDG was founded on 28 September 1947 by a faction of the Revolutionary Action Party (PAR). The leader of the VDG was José Manuel Fortuny. The group had Marxist inspiration, and operated a semi-clandestine fashion. It supported urban and rural labour movements.

In 1949, the VDG broke with the PAR and constituted the Communist Party of Guatemala (PCG).

References

Defunct political parties in Guatemala
Socialist parties in Guatemala